Kamchuga is a rural locality (a settlement) and the administrative center of Medvedevskoye Rural Settlement, Totemsky District, Vologda Oblast, Russia. The population was 760 as of 2002. There are 5 streets.

Geography 
Kamchuga is located 29 km northeast of Totma (the district's administrative centre) by road. Kamchuga (village) is the nearest rural locality.

References 

Rural localities in Tarnogsky District